Harri Morgan (born 16 March 2000) is a Welsh rugby union player who plays for the Ospreys as a scrum-half. He is a Wales under-20 international.

Morgan made his debut for the Ospreys in 2018 having previously played for the Ospreys academy, Bridgend Ravens and the Ospreys Development . He made his Challenge Cup debut on 13 October 2018 against Pau. He also became the first player to represent to Ospreys, and to score for the Ospreys, who was born in the 21st century.

References

External links 
Ospreys Player Profile

Welsh rugby union players
Ospreys (rugby union) players
Living people
2000 births
Rugby union scrum-halves
Ampthill RUFC players
Rugby union players from Bridgend